Ballognatha is a spider genus of the jumping spider family, Salticidae, with the single species B. typica. It occurs in Karakorum.

The species and genus were described based on a single immature and misclassified specimen. It is highly likely that there exists no real species with characters fitting the original description. Genus and species are thus a nomen dubium.

Name
The genus name is a combination of the related salticid genus Ballus and Ancient Greek gnath- "jaw".

Footnotes

References
  (2007): The world spider catalog, version 8.0. American Museum of Natural History.

Further reading
  (1935): Aracnidi dell'Himalaia e del Karakoram, raccolti dalla Missione italiana al Karakoram (1929-VII). Mem. Soc. ent. ital. 13: 161-263.

Salticidae
Endemic fauna of Mongolia
Monotypic Salticidae genera
Spiders of Asia